Christoph Loch was the Director (Dean) of Cambridge Judge Business School at the University of Cambridge from 2011 until August 31, 2021 when he was replaced by Professor Mauro Guillén who joined from Wharton (University of Pennsylvania). He also held a fellowship at Pembroke College. He was announced he would step down in the Summer of 2021 after two mandates. Professor Loch took office on 1 September 2011, having previously held the position of GlaxoSmithKline Chaired Professor of Corporate Innovation and Professor of Technology and Operations Management at INSEAD, where he also served as Dean of the INSEAD PhD programme from 2006-2009. He is associate editor of the Journal of Management Science, and he serves on the editorial boards of the Journal of Engineering and Technology Management and the Journal of Research Technology Management.

Loch holds a PhD in business from the Graduate School of Business at Stanford University, an MBA from the University of Tennessee, and a Diplom-Wirtschaftsingenieur degree from the Technische Universität Darmstadt.

He is a prolific case writer and also featured on the list of The Case Centre's all-time top authors list (covering 40 years) released in 2014.

References

External links 
 Christoph Loch's blog
 Christoph Loch's academic profile on the website of Cambridge Judge Business School

Fellows of Pembroke College, Cambridge
Living people
German academics
Stanford University alumni
University of Tennessee alumni
Technische Universität Darmstadt alumni
Year of birth missing (living people)
Academic staff of INSEAD